Size Really Does Matter is the third album of the American band Pretty Boy Floyd. It is their first studio record not to feature guitarist Kristy "Krash" Majors and drummer Kari Kane.

Although the album was not commercially successful, it received positive reviews from music critics such as Allmusic.

Notably the album features no songs written by former guitarist Ariel Stiles or Kristy Majors. Stiles has been quoted as saying that he "was very happy to see Steve create some new music with new people"

The song Dead is a cover of Lesli's old band, The Distractions.

727 is written for drummer Dish's sister who died in a car accident on 27 July 2002. This was written by Lesli Sanders

The album was co-produced by bassist, Lesli Sanders and Brian Haught.

Track listing
All songs written by Lesli Sanders, Steve Summers, Tchad Drats, Dish
 Dead
 Suicide
 I've Got Nothing
 Earth Girls
 Things I've Said
 Another Day (In The Death Of America)
 2Heads2Faces
 Fuck The Rock
 727
 It's Alright

Band
 Steve "Sex" Summers - lead vocals
 T'Chad - guitar
 Lesli Sanders - bass
 Dish - drums

Credits
Brian Haught - producer, engineer, mixing
Lesli Sanders - producer, concept, artwork
Dan Kincaid - engineer

References

2003 albums
Pretty Boy Floyd (American band) albums